John Haggan (16 December 1896 – June 1982) was an English professional football wing half who played in the Football League for Brentford and Sunderland.

Career statistics

References

1896 births
1982 deaths
People from The Boldons
Footballers from Tyne and Wear
English footballers
Association football wing halves
Sunderland A.F.C. players
Brentford F.C. players
North Shields F.C. players
Usworth Colliery A.F.C. players
English Football League players
English expatriate footballers
English expatriate sportspeople in Canada
Expatriate soccer players in Canada